The 1962 Iowa State Cyclones football team represented Iowa State University in the Big Eight Conference during the 1962 NCAA University Division football season. In their fifth year under head coach Clay Stapleton, the Cyclones compiled a 5–5 record (3–4 against conference opponents), finished in fifth place in the conference, and scored the same number of points (235) as they allowed on defense. They played their home games at Clyde Williams Field in Ames, Iowa.

The regular starting lineup on offense consisted of left end Larry Schreiber, left tackle John Van Sicklen, left guard Tim Brown, center Ray Steffy, right guard Dick Walton, right tackle Norm Taylor, right end John McGonegle, quarterback Larry Switzer, halfbacks Dave Hoppmann and Otis Williams, and fullback Tim Vaughn. Larry Schreiber was the placekicker. Jim Clapper was the team captain.

The team's statistical leaders included Dave Hoppmann with 798 rushing yards, 679 passing yards, and 66 points (11 touchdowns), and Dick Limerick with 296 receiving yards. Hoppman was selected as a first-team all-conference player.

The 1962 season was the last time the Cyclones hosted the Oklahoma Sooners until 1966, due to Cyclones making more money playing games in Norman, Oklahoma than they did at home.

Schedule

References

Iowa State
Iowa State Cyclones football seasons
Iowa State Cyclones football